Jill Mansell (born 15 June ?) is a British author of romantic comedy. Her books have sold over fourteen million copies worldwide.

Background and personal life 
Mansell grew up in the Cotswolds and attended Sir William Romney's School in Tetbury. After working at the Burden Neurological Institute in Bristol for many years, she became a full-time writer in 1992. She lives in Bristol with her partner and children.

Writing career
Jill Mansell is among the bestselling and most well-known chick-lit authors. She is one of the top 20 British female novelists of the 21st century (in terms of sales) and has been worth almost £14.5m to the market since 2000. In 2009, The Daily Telegraph listed Jill Mansell as one of the best-selling authors of the decade. Her novel Rumour Has It spent eight weeks in The Sunday Times hardback bestseller list in 2009 and the paperback ranked third in The Sunday Times bestseller list. An Offer You Can't Refuse was in The Sunday Times paperback charts for five weeks in 2008. "In 2008, sales of Jill's novels in their Headline editions around the world are now at over 4m copies." The E-book of 'Miranda's Big Mistake' ranked eleventh in The New York Times best-seller list in 2011.

Awards and honours
In 2011, Take A Chance On Me won the Romantic Novelists Association's Romantic Comedy Prize. The judges said the book has "beautifully understated humour" and is "an utter delight." In 2012, To The Moon And Back was shortlisted for the Romantic Novelists Association's Contemporary Romantic Novel award.   In 2015 Jill was presented with an Outstanding Achievement award by the RNA.

Novels
Fast Friends (1991)
Solo (1992) 
Kiss (1993)
Sheer Mischief (1994)
Open House (1995)
Two's Company (1996)
Perfect Timing (1997)
Head Over Heels (1998)
Mixed Doubles (1998)
Miranda's Big Mistake (1999)
Good at Games (2000)
Millie's Fling (2001)
Nadia Knows Best (2002)
Staying at Daisy's (2002)
Falling for You (2003)
The One You Really Want (2004)
Making Your Mind Up (2006)
Thinking of You (2007)
An Offer You Can't Refuse (2008)
Rumour Has It (2009)
Take A Chance On Me (2010)
To The Moon And Back (2011)
A Walk in the Park (2012)
Don't Want to Miss a Thing (2013)
The Unpredictable Consequences of Love (2014)
Three Amazing Things About You  (2015)
You And Me, Always (2016)
Meet Me at Beachcomber Bay (2017)
This Could Change Everything (2018)
Maybe This Time (2019)
It Started With a Secret (2020)
And now you're back (2021)
Should I Tell You? (2022)
Promise Me (2023)

References

External links
Official website

Year of birth missing (living people)
Living people
English women novelists
20th-century English women writers
20th-century English writers
21st-century English women writers
English romantic fiction writers
Women romantic fiction writers